Otakou is a settlement within the boundaries of the city of Dunedin, New Zealand.  It is located 25 kilometres from the city centre at the eastern end of Otago Peninsula, close to the entrance of Otago Harbour. Though a small fishing village, Otakou is important in the history of Otago for several reasons. The settlement is the modern centre and traditional home of the Ōtākou  (assembly) of Ngāi Tahu. In 1946 Otakou Fisheries was founded in the township; this was later to become a major part of the Otago fishing industry.

History
The name  is thought to come from Māori words meaning either "single village" or "place of red earth". Prior to the arrival of European settlers, the place was a prominent Māori settlement, and it is still the site of Otago's most important  (meeting ground). By the early 19th century, the three Māori  of Ngāi Tahu, Kāti Māmoe and Waitaha had blended into a single tribal entity. The Treaty of Waitangi was signed nearby in 1840 on the H.M.S Herald by two important chiefs, who were descended from all three tribes.

Prior to the standardisation of Māori spelling in the 1840s, the name was written as "Otago", reflecting its pronunciation in a local southern Māori dialect. The name originally referred to the channel off Wellers Rock but was transferred to the lower harbour as a whole, the port, the nearby Māori settlements and the Weller brothers' whaling establishment, one of the region's oldest European settlements, which had been founded in 1831. The old Māori names for the Māori settlements were Te Ruatitiko, Tahakopa, Omate and Ohinetu.

In December 1817 the Sophia, a Hobart sealing ship captained by James Kelly, anchored in the waters of the harbour near Otakou. A small group of men, including Captain Kelly, took a rowing boat around Heyward Point to visit Whareakeake, then the site of a Māori  (village), where one of the men, William Tucker, had a house and a business selling . For reasons that remain speculative, the encounter turned violent and three of Kelly's men, including Tucker, were killed. The survivors rowed back to the Sophia but, according to Kelly's account of the event, found her boarded by Māori from Otakou and retook her in a bloody fight. Historians caution that Kelly's account, made to justify the actions he took, exaggerates the danger he and his men were in. This incident is treated as an episode in the ongoing state of lawless conflict known as the Sealers' War.

Present use
Otakou remains an important centre of Ngāi Tahu life, as the location of Ōtākou Marae.

Otakou is located close to Taiaroa Head, the site of an albatross colony and other wildlife such as seals and penguins.

Demographics

Ōtākou-Harington Point had a population of 192 at the 2018 New Zealand census, an increase of 30 people (18.5%) since the 2013 census, and an increase of 21 people (12.3%) since the 2006 census. There were 102 households. There were 99 males and 90 females, giving a sex ratio of 1.1 males per female. The median age was 57.8 years (compared with 37.4 years nationally), with 18 people (9.4%) aged under 15 years, 18 (9.4%) aged 15 to 29, 93 (48.4%) aged 30 to 64, and 60 (31.2%) aged 65 or older.

Ethnicities were 81.2% European/Pākehā, 32.8% Māori, 3.1% Pacific peoples, 3.1% Asian, and 1.6% other ethnicities (totals add to more than 100% since people could identify with multiple ethnicities).

Although some people objected to giving their religion, 59.4% had no religion, 31.2% were Christian and 4.7% had other religions.

Of those at least 15 years old, 30 (17.2%) people had a bachelor or higher degree, and 30 (17.2%) people had no formal qualifications. The median income was $19,200, compared with $31,800 nationally. The employment status of those at least 15 was that 48 (27.6%) people were employed full-time, 36 (20.7%) were part-time, and 9 (5.2%) were unemployed.

References

Further reading

Populated places in Otago
Otago Peninsula
Whaling stations in New Zealand